The Wisconsin Badgers represent the University of Wisconsin in WCHA women's ice hockey during the 2017-18 NCAA Division I women's ice hockey season.

Offseason

Annie Pankowski and four alumni were named to the US National Team that will train for the 2018 Olympics in Korea, while Emily Clark and four alumni have been named to the Canadian team, which will send 23 of 28 players to Korea.

Recruiting

Roster

2017–18 Badgers

Standings

2017-18 Schedule

|-
!colspan=12 style="  "| Regular Season

Awards and honors
Kristen Campbell, 2017-18 Second Team All-America

References

Wisconsin
NCAA women's ice hockey Frozen Four seasons
Wisconsin Badgers women's ice hockey seasons
Wisconsin
Wisconsin
Wisconsin